Birgitz is a community in the district of Innsbruck in Tyrol and lies on a terrace of the highlands 10 km south west of the capital. The nearest neighbouring village is Axams in the west and Götzens in the east.

Already around 100 BC the name „Birga“ was known in the area. Due to a high increase in population Birgitz will eventually merge with Götzens some time.

Population

References

External links
 www.geschichte-tirol.com: Birgitz (German)
 Offizielle Tourismus-Homepage von Birgitz, "Innsbruck und seine Feriendörfer" 
 Offizielle Seite der Freiwilligen Feuerwehr Birgitz,

Cities and towns in Innsbruck-Land District